Sabre (subtitled Slow Fade of an Endangered Species), published in August 1978, is the title of an American graphic novel. Created by writer Don McGregor and artist Paul Gulacy, it was published by Eclipse Enterprises, whose eventual division Eclipse Comics would publish a spin-off comic-book series. It was one of the first graphic novels and the first to be distributed in comic book shops.

Publication history
The initial project of Eclipse Enterprises, the graphic novel Sabre is a 38-page, black-and-white, science fiction swashbuckler in which the self-consciously romantic rebel Sabre and his companion Melissa Siren fight the mercenary Blackstar Blood and others to achieve freedom and strike a blow for individuality, all amid a futuristic Disneyland-turned-torture-chamber. It was published in August 1978 with no ISBN number.  The Eclipse graphic novel came 2 months after a try-out of the first 8 pages were featured in the June 1978 issue of Heavy Metal Magazine ("Prologue One" featuring Sabre and Melissa Siren).  This would mark the actual first appearance of both characters.

As McGregor described the project's genesis in the afterword of the original edition, writer-editor Jim Salicrup, who in 1976 was toying with the idea of producing a weekly newspaper tabloid, asked McGregor to write a weekly adventure comic strip. McGregor had unsuccessfully pitched a feature called "Dagger" to Marvel Comics, for which he wrote features including "The Black Panther" and "Killraven, Warrior of the Worlds":

He later wrote, "I think I took a token sum of money from Dean Mullaney ... of $300. I wanted Dean to be able to afford to do the book. He invested in the book for over a year. Everyone else was paid over their [usual] page rate."

Described on the credits page as a "comic novel" (the term "graphic novel" not being in common usage at the time), it was followed in 1982 by a 14-issue comic book series (cover-dated August 1982 – August 1985) by McGregor and, consecutively, the artists Billy Graham and José Ortiz. The first two issues reprinted the graphic novel in color. According to McGregor, Eclipse co-founder Jan Mullaney strongly objected to some of the series' content, such as the graphic depiction of childbirth and the kiss between gay men, saying that it would cost them sales.

Annette Kawecki was the letterer. P. Craig Russell inked "several" pages, Gulacy said in 1980. The first graphic novel to be sold in the new "direct market" of comic-book stores, the book, priced at a then-considerable $6.00, helped prove the new format's viability by going into a second printing, dated February 1979.

Publisher Dean Mullaney recalled in 2008,

Eclipse published a 10th-anniversary edition of the original graphic novel (hardcover, ; trade paperback) with a new Gulacy cover and Jim Steranko logo.  A 20th-anniversary edition was published by Image Comics in 1998, and a 30th-anniversary edition by Desperado Publishing in 2008.

Plot
By February 2020, Earth has succumbed to global famine, energy crises, a plague based on a leaked American-government bioweapon, and, in the U.S., a nine-year drought and a variety of terrorist acts including the contamination of Manhattan's water supply. The U.S. government retreated to a fortress and commenced battling rebels through proxies known as Overseers. One rebel, Sabre, arrives at an abandoned theme park intending to free a group of captured comrades. With him is his lover and fellow rebel, Melissa Siren. As the local Overseer and technician Misty Visions follow their whereabouts, using security cameras that cover most but not every part of the park, Sabre and Melissa infiltrate the park's fantasyland castle and encounter animatronic mermaids and musicians while discussing the nature of men, women and the world that has been left to them. Hunting them are the mercenary Blackstar Blood, who sees Sabre as an honorable adversary, and the Overseer's troops – including the nervous, prattling Willoughby, and Grouse, an "ani-human construction" resembling a hybrid human and jungle cat.

Sabre, fully aware the hostages serve as bait to trap him, nonetheless commandeers a replica of an old sailing ship as he searches for the captives. Blackstar and his crew ram it with one of their own, and capture the duo. Sabre is taken to a Synchronization Center, where, displayed before a gathering of scientists and officials, his memories are methodically wiped clean as he is forced to view Melissa, in a brothel suite, being groped and violated by Clarence, a sentient skeleton, and Grouse. She feigns submissiveness and steals Grouse's metal whip, swinging its bunched coils to tear apart Grouse's robotic head and whipping Clarence until he falls apart. Willoughby, who'd been repulsed by his comrades actions, unlocks her shackles.

In the Synchronization Center, the Overseer frees a docile-seeming Sabre, who instantly fights back, having resisted the removal of his last few memories and pieces of identity. Escaping with a gun, he reaches the brothel suite but finds Melissa gone – and is told by the Overseer that she is dead. They prepare to duel, while elsewhere, Melissa and Willoughby bond as they talk about what brought him here. He tells her the Overseer is keeping the captive rebels in the castle's dungeon. As Blackstar and his men hunt Melissa, the dueling Sabre and Overseer fall from a building onto the monorail tracks just below. Technician Visions prepares to shoot Sabre, but Blackstar kills her out of disgust for the way Sabre and Melissa were tortured and wanting to best Sabre personally. As Sabre and the Overseer battle, and as Blackstar charges his horse toward them while a monorail bears down on all, Melissa and the freed rebels attack. Melissa takes a horse from one of Blackstar's men and rides onto the monorail track, chasing Blackstar. Sabre overpowers the Overseer, but when he sees Blackstar, Melissa and the monorail bearing down, he loses his grip. Blackstar fires his weapon at the monorail, destroying it in a cataclysm that throws the combatants and horses from the track. Sabre shoots the Overseer dead. Blackstar, saying he is now unemployed, suggests that Sabre leave before more forces arrive to capture him.

Two months later, a pregnant Melissa, knowing militias are hunting Sabre, orders him to leave without her. He does, vowing to return for her and their child.

References

External links
Sabre at Don McGregor official site. Archived from the original on August 12, 2015.

1978 graphic novels
1978 comics debuts
1982 comics debuts
American graphic novels
Characters created by Don McGregor
Comics set in the 2020s
Fictional swordfighters in comics
Post-apocalyptic comics
Science fiction comics